Graham Clifford Goodwin  (born 20 April 1945 Broken Hill, New South Wales) is an Australian Laureate Professor of Electrical Engineering at the University of Newcastle, Australia.

Life
Graham Goodwin is an Emeritus Laureate Professor of Electrical Engineering at the University of Newcastle. His education includes B.Sc., B.E. and Ph.D. from the University of New South Wales. He won the 1990 M A Sargent Medal, Engineers Australia. In 2010 he was awarded the IEEE Control Systems Field Award and in 2013 he received the Rufus T. Oldenburger Medal from the American Society of Mechanical Engineers. He was twice awarded the International Federation of Automatic Control triannual Best Engineering Text Book Prize. He is a Fellow of IEEE; an Honorary Fellow of Institute of Engineers, Australia; a Fellow of the International Federation of Automatic Control, a Fellow of the Australian Academy of Science; a Fellow of the Australian Academy of Technology, Science and Engineering; a Member of the International Statistical Institute; a Fellow of the Royal Society, London and a Foreign Member of the Royal Swedish Academy of Sciences. He holds Honorary Doctorates from Lund Institute of Technology, Sweden and the Technion Israel. Goodwin was appointed an Officer of the Order of Australia in the 2021 Australia Day Honours for "distinguished service to tertiary education, and to electrical engineering, as an academic and researcher, and to scientific academies".

He is the co-author of ten books, four edited books, and five hundred papers. He holds 16 International Patents covering rolling mill technology, telecommunications, mine planning and mineral exploration. His current research interests include power electronics, boiler control systems and management of Type 1 diabetes.

Books
Graham Clifford Goodwin, Stefan F. Graebe, Mario E. Salgado, Control system design, Prentice Hall, 2001, 

Graham Clifford Goodwin, Stefan F. Graebe. Doctorate and Beyond: Building a Career in Engineering and the Physical Sciences. Springer. .

References

1945 births
Living people
People from Broken Hill, New South Wales
University of New South Wales alumni
Academic staff of the University of Newcastle (Australia)
Australian electrical engineers
Officers of the Order of Australia
Fellows of the Royal Society
Fellows of the Australian Academy of Science
Fellows of the Australian Academy of Technological Sciences and Engineering
Members of the Royal Swedish Academy of Sciences
Recipients of the M. A. Sargent Medal